Tom Thomson (born 1942) is a Canadian football player who played for the Edmonton Eskimos.

References

Living people
1942 births
Edmonton Elks players